Before 2021, Rajasthan Pre-Engineering Test (RPET) was the state-level entrance examination for undergraduate engineering programs in Rajasthan State, India.

Students wanting a B.Tech or  B.E. were required to take RPET( except for  BITS Pilani, MNIT Jaipur and other deemed private universities).

Online applications (registration) for RPET were invited by the Board of Technical Education, Rajasthan from eligible candidates of Rajasthan , including the wards of Kashmiri Migrants.

Structure 
RPET-2014 consisted of a single examination of three hours duration containing 40 objective type questions each in physics, chemistry and mathematics. The total number of questions were 120 carrying one mark each. There were no negative marking for wrong answers.

Eligibility criteria for admission 
 The minimum academic qualification for admission to B.Tech./B.E. program in Rajasthan was an RPET pass with at least 45% marks (40% marks in case of candidates belonging to "SC/ST/ Non Creamy Layer OBC/ Non Creamy Layer SBC" of Rajasthan state) in the subjects combination as given below taken together, in the final examination of 10+2 (Class XII) of Board of Secondary Education, Rajasthan or any other examination recognized equivalent thereto by Board of Secondary Education, Rajasthan/ Central Board of Secondary Education (CBSE).
 Subject combination required in the qualifying examination for admission to B.Tech. / B.E course shall be as under:
 Compulsory subjects: Physics and Mathematics
 Any one of the optional subjects:
 Chemistry
Bio-technology
Computer Science
Biology

Recent Development 

RPET was replaced in 2021 by REAP (Rajasthan Engineering Admission Process).

References

External links
 No More RPET 2015

Engineering colleges in Rajasthan
Education in Rajasthan
Engineering entrance examinations in India
Educational institutions in India with year of establishment missing